Haute Vallée School is a secondary school with 550 students owned and operated by the States of Jersey, and located in the parish of St Helier in Jersey.

Stuart Hughes was appointed headteacher in 2017.

Academic performance
In 2011 18% of pupils achieved A* - C GCSE in five subjects, compared to 58% in all Jersey schools and 53% for all UK schools. The figure for 2010 was 20%. Some other Jersey schools, such as Grainville School, also performed poorly in 2011. Other independent schools in Jersey performed much better.

In 2019 the school banned mobile telephones in order to improve students' results.

School buildings
The school buildings were designed by Architecture PLB. They are energy-efficient and are designed around a central open space, with a granite-clad tower as a reminder of Jersey's history. The school hall also functions as a 350-seat theatre.

References

External links
 
 Archive material relating to the school at Jersey Heritage

Schools in Jersey